Rucañanco Airport,  is an airstrip serving the Río Bueno commune in the Los Ríos Region of Chile.

The runway is crossed by a road  from the south end, and has an additional  unpaved overrun on the north end.

See also

Transport in Chile
List of airports in Chile

References

External links
OpenStreetMap - Rucañanco
OurAirports - Rucañanco
FallingRain - Rucañanco Airport

Airports in Chile
Airports in Los Ríos Region